Coutances is a commune in the Manche department in Normandy in north-western France.

History

Capital of the Unelli, a Gaulish tribe, the town was given the name of Constantia in 298 during the reign of Roman emperor Constantius Chlorus. The surrounding region, called in Latin the pagus Constantinus, subsequently became known as the Cotentin Peninsula.

The town was destroyed by invading Normans in 866; they later established settlements and incorporated the whole peninsula into the Duchy of Normandy in 933.

On 17 July 1944, during the Battle of Normandy during World War II, the city was bombed during the Allied offensive against the occupying Germans.

Geography

Climate
Coutances has a oceanic climate (Köppen climate classification Cfb).

Population

Sights
Coutances Cathedral is one of the major buildings of Norman architecture and contains a chapel and stained glass dedicated to Saint Marcouf. The bishop of Coutances exercised ecclesiastical jurisdiction over the Channel Islands until the Reformation, despite the secular division of Normandy in 1204. The final rupture occurred definitively in 1569.

Coutances houses a well-known botanical garden and an art museum.

Jazz festival
Coutances is the location of Jazz sous les pommiers ("Jazz under the apple trees"), an annual jazz festival held since 1982. The festival traditionally takes place during the week of Ascension.

International relations

Coutances is twinned with:

Heraldry

See also 

Roman Catholic Diocese of Coutances

References

Communes of Manche
Subprefectures in France
Gallia Lugdunensis